The men's 4 x 10 kilometre relay at the FIS Nordic World Ski Championships 2013 was held on 1 March 2013.

Results
The race started at 13:30.

References

FIS Nordic World Ski Championships 2013